Jules Lapierre  (born 2 January 1996) is a French cross-country skier who competes internationally.
 
He represented France at the 2018 Winter Olympics.

Cross-country skiing results
All results are sourced from the International Ski Federation (FIS).

Olympic Games

Distance reduced to 30 km due to weather conditions.

World Championships
1 medal – (1 bronze)

World Cup

Season standings

Individual podiums
 1 podium – (1 )

References

External links

1996 births
Living people
French male cross-country skiers
Olympic cross-country skiers of France
Cross-country skiers at the 2018 Winter Olympics
Cross-country skiers at the 2022 Winter Olympics
Tour de Ski skiers
Sportspeople from Grenoble
FIS Nordic World Ski Championships medalists in cross-country skiing
20th-century French people
21st-century French people